William Douglas "Tripp" Schwenk III (born June 17, 1971) is an American former competition swimmer, Olympic champion, and former world record-holder.

Schwenk represented the United States at two consecutive Olympic Games.  At the 1992 Summer Olympics in Barcelona, Spain, he competed in the men's 200-meter backstroke and finished fifth in the event final in a time of 1:59.73.

At the 1996 Summer Olympics in Atlanta, Georgia, he received a gold medal for swimming for the winning U.S. team in the preliminary heats of the men's 4×100-meter medley.  Individually, Schwenk also received the silver medal for recording a 1:58.99 second-place finish in the men's 200-meter backstroke.  He also competed in the men's 100-meter backstroke, finishing in fifth place in the final with a time of 55.30 seconds.

See also
 List of Olympic medalists in swimming (men)
 List of University of Tennessee people
 World record progression 4 × 100 metres medley relay

References

External links
 
 
 
 

1971 births
Living people
American male backstroke swimmers
American male medley swimmers
World record setters in swimming
Olympic gold medalists for the United States in swimming
Olympic silver medalists for the United States in swimming
Sportspeople from Sarasota, Florida
Swimmers at the 1992 Summer Olympics
Swimmers at the 1995 Pan American Games
Swimmers at the 1996 Summer Olympics
Tennessee Volunteers men's swimmers
Medalists at the FINA World Swimming Championships (25 m)
Medalists at the 1996 Summer Olympics
Pan American Games silver medalists for the United States
Pan American Games medalists in swimming
Universiade medalists in swimming
Universiade gold medalists for the United States
Universiade silver medalists for the United States
Universiade bronze medalists for the United States
Medalists at the 1991 Summer Universiade
Medalists at the 1993 Summer Universiade
Medalists at the 1995 Pan American Games
20th-century American people